La Seyne–Six-Fours station (French: Gare de La Seyne–Six-Fours) is a railway station serving the town La Seyne-sur-Mer, Var department, southeastern France. It is situated on the Marseille–Ventimiglia railway. The station is served by regional trains (TER Provence-Alpes-Côte d'Azur) to Marseille and Toulon. –

See also 

 List of SNCF stations in Provence-Alpes-Côte d'Azur

References

Railway stations in Var
Railway stations in France opened in 1859